These are the Billboard magazine number-one albums of 1967, per the Billboard 200. May 13, 1967 was the first chart to list 200 albums, however the chart name didn't change to Billboard 200 until September 7, 1991.

Chart history

See also
1967 in music

References

1967
United States Albums